Copa Airlines Flight 201 was a regularly scheduled passenger flight from Tocumen International Airport in Panama City, Panama to Alfonso Bonilla Aragón International Airport in Cali, Colombia. On 6 June 1992, the Boeing 737-204 Advanced operating the route rolled, entered a steep dive, disintegrated in mid-air, and crashed into the jungle of the Darién Gap 29 minutes after takeoff, killing all 47 people on board. The in-flight break-up was caused by faulty instrument readings and several other contributing factors, including incomplete training.

Flight 201 is the deadliest accident in Panamanian aviation history, and the only fatal crash in the history of Copa Airlines.

Aircraft and crew 
The aircraft was a 12-year-old Boeing 737-200, with registration  piloted by Captain Rafael Carlos Chial (53), and First Officer Cesareo Tejada (25), with 5 Flight Attendants on this flight. Copa 201 was carrying 40 passengers and 7 crew. The jet was manufactured in 1980 and entered service with Britannia Airways bearing tail number G-BGYL. The aircraft was acquired by Copa Airlines  2 months before the crash as a result of the leasing agreement that both companies had in the 1990s, and the aircraft still used a hybrid Britannia/Copa livery (still wore Britannia stripes, but with "Copa" titles on the forward fuselage and tail, and the Panamanian flag on the middle part of the fuselage) at the time of the accident.

Crash 

Flight 201 took off from runway 21L at Tocumen International Airport in Panama City at 20:37 (8:37 p.m.) local time as a scheduled passenger flight to Cali, Colombia, with 40 passengers and seven crew members. Among the passengers were Colombian merchants conducting business in Panama. At 20:47 (8:47 p.m.), about 10 minutes after takeoff, Captain Chial contacted Panama City Air Traffic Control, requesting weather information. The controller reported that there was an area of very bad weather  from their position.

At 20:48 (8:48 p.m.), Captain Chial made another radio contact requesting permission from Panama City ATC to fly a different route due to the severe weather ahead.

It has been reported that at 20:54, the captain reported problems with the airplane and made a request to turn back to Tocumen, which was granted.

Problems with the aircraft began at 20:55, shortly before completion of return to course after diverting the storm. ADI began to display false data to pilots, by only occasional updating of their bank angle, because of a short circuit, confusing them. Finally, at 20:56, Flight 201 banked to the right and entered a steep dive at an angle of 80 degrees to the right and began to roll uncontrollably while accelerating towards the ground. Most of the bodies had their clothes torn off and were thrown away from the aircraft.

At 20:57 (8:57 p.m.), Tocumen Air Traffic Control tried unsuccessfully to make contact with flight until it received a radio message from a KLM DC-10 aircraft that was approaching the airport, reporting that they intercepted a distress signal from Flight 201's transponder in an area between the Colombian border and Darien Province, several kilometres away from their position. After several unsuccessful attempts to contact the lost plane, Tocumen ATC finally declared a full emergency in the airport and informed the Colombian ATC centre at Bogota about the missing plane. At dawn the next day, search aircraft were sent to Flight 201's last known position.

After 8 hours, searchers spotted the first pieces of wreckage in the jungle of the Darien Gap. Because of the remoteness of the area and the difficulty of access, it took rescue personnel 12 hours to reach the site.

After investigators reached the crash site, the investigation to find the cause of the crash began.

Nationalities of the victims 

The aircraft was carrying 47 people: 40 passengers and a crew of seven. Fatalities included 36  Colombians, eight Panamanians, two Americans, and one Italian.

Examination and investigation 

The cockpit voice recorder was recovered and flown to Panama City, then to the United States, for analysis by the National Transportation Safety Board. However, NTSB analysts discovered that the tape was broken due to a maintenance error. It was repaired, but the recording on the tape was from another flight. Crash investigators had better luck with the flight data recorder, which showed the plane was in a high-speed dive before breaking up. FDR also showed that the aircraft several times suddenly banked, in less than a second, which was considered unprecendeted for a commercial aircraft.

The trouble was later traced to a faulty wiring harness in the Attitude Director Indicator (ADI) instruments. The wires were frayed due to damage by long term over-stress, which caused an intermittent short circuit in the flow of data from the pilot side Vertical Gyro (VG), VG-1, to the pilot side ADI. Because FDR received information from VG-1, it was displaying wrong information, and "sudden" bankings of the aircraft which FDR recorded were actually much more gradual.

This issue was compounded on the accident flight. There are two ADI displays, fed independently by their own VG – one ADI/VG pair for the pilot, a separate pair for the co-pilot. In case one of the VG has a problem, the crew can manually switch either ADI to use the other VG. The switch of the Captain's ADI was found at the scene of the accident in the "Both on VG-1" position, feeding both of the ADI from the same, intermittently faulty, pilot side VG.

As a consequence, both the ADI would momentarily stay unchanged (no new data making it through), leading the crew  to believe the plane was still flying in a particular attitude, thereby prompting a further control input by the crew, expecting the ADI to show that they had achieved the new attitude as requested.  In essence, the ADI told the crew the plane was still banking left, thereby prompting more pilot input to bank right. This reaction rolled the aircraft to almost 80 degrees and caused it to go into a steep dive, with no chance for recovery.

The investigation team also found that the backup ADI (Stand-by) was probably available to the pilots during the intermittent failure of the main instruments systems (the post-impact damage of the Stand-by indicator showed that it was operating properly up to impact with the ground), but due to an ineffective cross-checking procedure done by the pilots, the backup ADI was not used correctly to identify the problem and select a reliable source of attitude information.

Another factor contributing to the crash was that the Copa Airlines' ground training simulator program was ineffective, as it did not present enough information relating to the differences between aircraft and crew resource management in order to give to the flight crew knowledge to overcome intermittent attitude indicator errors and to maintain control of an aircraft with the ADI/VG auxiliary instruments. Moreover, on the accident aircraft, the pilots were trying to apply what they had learned in the simulator relating to this issue, but due to the movement of the ADI's switch to the position of "Both on VG-1" and the insufficient information during their training; the reference from VG-2 was lost and the pilots were unable to identify the problem as a consequence.

Another factor contributing to the crash was the non-standard cockpit configurations between aircraft in the fleet of the company, including inconsistencies between aircraft and the simulators used for training. This caused confusion to the pilots about determining the setting of the ADI switches for the aircraft that was being operated at the time.

Despite bearing some similarities to other incidents related to the Boeing 737 during the 1990s (such as United Airlines Flight 585), the possibility of rudder deflection in flight was discarded as a possible cause of the crash. However, Flight 201 was registered on the category of "accidents related to suspicious rudder deflection".

Eyewitness accounts
In the morning of the next day, Colombian and Panamanian radio stations were reporting that some residents of Tucutí and other villages nearby to the crash site said that on the night of the accident they felt a very strong explosion, meanwhile others said that they saw a burning object that was falling from the sky towards the jungle.

However, these reports were eventually dismissed by the head of Panama's civil aviation authority, Zosimo Guardia.

Aftermath

Response from Copa Airlines 
In the wake of the disaster, Copa gave flights to Panama City to the families of the victims; the main executive members of Copa Holdings declared a permanent emergency meeting session at the airline's main headquarters in Panama City.

Copa Airlines had to strengthen its training program for flight crews: in particular, for pilots learning to fly different types of aircraft, and in several skills such as overcoming intermittent Attitude Director Indicator (ADI) errors and the ability to maintain control of the aircraft during instrument failures in adverse weather conditions. Copa also had to reconfigure the operations of its fleet via a major  overhaul until it became one of the most modern and safest airlines in the Americas.

The accident remains as the deadliest plane crash in Panamanian aviation and Copa Airlines' history as of 2022.

Lawsuits 
As a result of the accident, the relatives of those who perished in the crash filed 49 wrongful death lawsuits against Lucas Aerospace, one of the part suppliers of the Boeing 737. The case was settled out of court for an undisclosed amount.

In 1993, one of the relatives of Clariza Bernal Luna, one of the US passengers that were on the flight, filed a lawsuit against Copa Airlines in a Texas federal court, alleging that the airline had sold a ticket to the passenger through a travel agency in Houston, although the airline has no operations centre in Texas. The case was eventually dismissed by the court on 30 March 1994.

Media coverage
A year after the crash, the story of the crash of Flight 201 and its investigation was featured in a WGBH, BBC, and NDR documentary. It was screened in the United States in the PBS NOVA series as Mysterious Crash of Flight 201 on 30 November 1993, and in the United Kingdom in the Horizon series as Air Crash - The Deadly Puzzle on 14 February 1994.

The crash was also the subject of a Season 14 episode of the Discovery Channel/National Geographic series Mayday. The episode featuring Flight 201, titled "Sideswiped", premiered in March 2015.

See also

 Sriwijaya Air Flight 182
 List of accidents and incidents involving airliners by location

References

External links
 PlaneCrashInfo.Com - COPA Flight 201 Entry
 Pictures of the plane in Britannia Airways livery — Airliners.Net
 Picture of the plane in hybrid Copa/Britannia livery — MyAviation.Net
 


Aviation accidents and incidents in 1992
Airliner accidents and incidents caused by instrument failure
Aviation accidents and incidents in Panama
1992 in Panama
Accidents and incidents involving the Boeing 737 Original
Copa Airlines accidents and incidents
June 1992 events in North America
Aviation accidents and incidents caused by loss of control